The 1921 Maine Black Bears football team was an American football team that represented the University of Maine during the 1921 college football season. In its first season under head coach Fred Brice, the team compiled a 2–5–1 record.

Schedule

References

Maine
Maine Black Bears football seasons
Maine Black Bears football